Podchorąży is a military title in Poland for officer cadets of various ranks. The term literally means "under-ensign," and historically referred to an officer in training who served as an assistant to a senior officer.

In the modern Polish Armed Forces, Podchorąży is a rank equivalent to the NATO rank codes OF-1a and OF-1b, which correspond to second lieutenant and lieutenant respectively. However, the title is also used in the context of officer training programs, where it may refer to a cadet who has not yet been commissioned as an officer.

There are several different types of officer cadet programs in Poland, each with its own specific requirements and duration. These include the Military Academy of Land Forces in Wrocław, the Military University of Technology in Warsaw, and the Naval Academy in Gdynia.

The rank of Podchorąży is typically achieved after completion of the initial officer training program and commissioning as a second lieutenant. However, in some cases, it may be used to refer to cadets who are still in training and have not yet been commissioned.

It's important to note that Podchorąży should not be confused with "Chorąży," which is a higher rank equivalent to the NATO rank codes OF-1c and OF-2, corresponding to lieutenant and captain respectively. The rank of "Chorąży" is typically achieved after several years of service as a commissioned officer, and is therefore not used to refer to cadets or officer candidates.

See also
Comparative military ranks

Military ranks of Poland